Mont-sur-Meurthe is a commune in the Meurthe-et-Moselle department in north-eastern France.

Geography
The village lies in the middle of the commune, where the river Mortagne flows into the Meurthe.

See also
Communes of the Meurthe-et-Moselle department

References

Montsurmeurthe